The 2006 Tri Nations Series was the 10th Tri Nations Series, an annual rugby union competition between the national teams of Australia, New Zealand and South Africa. New Zealand won the competition with three rounds still to play after their victory over Australia on 19 August, their 21st consecutive home win.

For the first time, in 2006 each team played the others three times, instead of twice, as had been the case previously. This was the result of a new television deal between SANZAR, the consortium of the three countries' rugby federations that organises the tournament, and broadcasters in the SANZAR countries and the United Kingdom. As a result, the duration of the competition was extended and it ran from 8 July to 9 September.

New Zealand won all three matches against Australia, thus retaining the Bledisloe Cup. They also won two of their three matches against South Africa, thereby winning the Freedom Cup for the first time. Australia regained the Mandela Challenge Plate after winning their two home tests against South Africa.

Standings

Format
As in past competitions, points were earned as follows:

4 points for a win
2 points for a draw
0 points for a loss
1 bonus point for scoring four tries or more, win or lose
1 bonus point for a loss by seven points or fewer

The run-up

Australia
At the end of 2005, the Wallabies looked to be in decline after having just ended an all-time record Test losing streak of seven. The streak led to the sacking of coach Eddie Jones and his replacement by John Connolly. The 2006 mid-year Tests saw improvement with two wins over England and a win over Ireland. Ireland's captain Brian O'Driscoll – who played against both Australia and New Zealand in Ireland's mid-year Tests – was more impressed by the Wallabies, and tipped them as favourites over the All Blacks.

New Zealand
Going into the competition, notwithstanding O'Driscoll's assessment, New Zealand were the clear favourites as the top-ranked team in the world, having lost just one Test in 2005 (their away fixture against South Africa in the Tri Nations) and gone undefeated through the 2006 mid-year Tests. However, All Blacks coach Graham Henry used the mid-year Tests to experiment with his squad. They had to come back in the last 20 minutes to win their first Test against Ireland, and had to survive a last-minute push by Argentina at José Amalfitani Stadium in Buenos Aires. Despite these close victories amid much New Zealand complacency, the All Blacks possessed a strong, co-ordinated forward pack, quality playmakers, explosive backs and blistering pace out wide. Their most important asset was arguably their depth in all positions.

Before the first test, the Australian television channel Seven aired an advertisement in which the All Blacks performed the Ka Mate haka with digitally inserted handbags, a reference to an incident where Tana Umaga hit a Hurricane teammate over the head with a woman's handbag, breaking her cellular phone. This advertisement was seen by some as offensive to both Maori and the All Blacks. The All Blacks performed the new Kapa o Pango haka instead of the Ka Mate in Christchurch for the first time against Australia. Some observers found gestures used in this haka to be offensive.

South Africa
Of the three teams in the competition, the Springboks entered with the most questions. The selection policy of coach Jake White was controversial in 2005, with White choosing to primarily stay with veterans of South Africa's victorious 2004 Tri Nations squad. His choices eventually panned out, with the Boks only narrowly losing out to New Zealand in the 2005 Tri Nations.

White largely stayed with his veterans in the 2006 mid-year Tests, which led to even more controversy among Boks supporters. In the meantime, several key Boks players were unavailable during the mid-year Tests due to injury, among them André Pretorius and Bakkies Botha. The Boks won two Tests over Scotland, but suffered a huge blow in the second Test when 2004 World Player of the Year Schalk Burger suffered a career-threatening neck injury. Recent articles indicated that Schalk Burger had a successful operation to his neck and he may play again next year. They went on to lose to France at Newlands, their first home loss since 2003. In that Test, they lost two key backs, Jean de Villiers and Bryan Habana, to rib injuries. De Villiers was initially expected to be out for the entire Tri Nations, though he returned for the final two matches, but Habana recovered in time for the series opener. As for other players, Pretorius would be out for at least the first two Boks matches, while Botha was out for the entire series. Partly due to the injuries, White named four newcomers to his Tri Nations squad.

During the lead-in to the Tri Nations, White also caused considerable controversy by publicly seeking an extension to his contract through 2009, even after the loss to France. Also, he was heavily criticised for his refusal to select flanker Luke Watson, arguably the country's form player, even after the loss of Burger. The criticism became more intense after the Boks' hammering in their Tri Nations opener.

Fixtures and results
Kick-off times are local

Week 1

Week 2

Week 3

Week 4

Notes:
 New Zealand retain Bledisloe Cup

Week 5

Week 6

Week 7

Week 8

Week 9

References

External links
 All Blacks Tri Nations website
 
 Wallabies Tri Nations website

Tri Nations Series
The Rugby Championship
Tri
Tri
Tri